John Raymond Hudek (born August 8, 1966) is a former Major League Baseball pitcher. He played all or part of six seasons in the majors, from  until , for five different teams. He appeared in a total of 194 major league games, all in relief, making the 1994 NL All-Star team as a rookie. Once, in a game on September 5, 1997, he was tasked to pitch against Brian Johnson with runners on. With two strikes, catcher Tony Pena seemed to call for an intentional walk before Hudek threw a pitch in the middle of the zone for a strike that struck-out Johnson. 

He is currently a baseball coach at a Houston area school.

References

External links

Venezuelan Professional Baseball League statistics

1966 births
Living people
American expatriate baseball players in Canada
Atlanta Braves players
Baseball players from Florida
Birmingham Barons players
Caribes de Oriente players
Cincinnati Reds players
Florida Southern Moccasins baseball players
Houston Astros players
Kissimmee Cobras players
Leones del Caracas players
National League All-Stars
Major League Baseball pitchers
Navegantes del Magallanes players
American expatriate baseball players in Venezuela
New Orleans Zephyrs players
New York Mets players
Richmond Braves players
Sarasota White Sox players
South Bend White Sox players
Syracuse SkyChiefs players
Toledo Mud Hens players
Toronto Blue Jays players
Tucson Toros players
Vancouver Canadians players
Henry B. Plant High School alumni